The Division of Casey is an Australian electoral division in the state of Victoria. The division was created in 1969 and is named for Richard Casey, who was Governor-General of Australia 1965–69.

The division is located in the outer eastern suburbs of Melbourne and extends into the Yarra Valley and Dandenong Ranges.

The current Member for Casey, since the 2022 federal election, is Aaron Violi, a member of the Liberal Party of Australia. His immediate predecessor is Tony Smith, who was Speaker of the House from 2015 through 2021, and was, after Bob Halverson, the second member for this electorate to occupy the chair.

Geography
Since 1984, federal electoral division boundaries in Australia have been determined at redistributions by a redistribution committee appointed by the Australian Electoral Commission. Redistributions occur for the boundaries of divisions in a particular state, and they occur every seven years, or sooner if a state's representation entitlement changes or when divisions of a state are malapportioned.

History

When it was created it was a highly marginal seat, and at the 1972 federal election it was regarded as the "litmus seat", which the Australian Labor Party had to win to gain government. Lost when the Liberals won in 1975, Labor picked it up again when Labor regained government in 1983. However, a redistribution ahead of the following year's election made Casey marginally Liberal.  The Liberals retook the seat in that election and have held it since then. Demographic changes have also contributed in making Casey a fairly safe seat for the Liberal Party, although a redistribution ahead of the 2013 federal election pushed the seat further north into the upper Yarra Valley, estimated to halve the Liberal two-party preferred majority of 4.2 per cent.

Prominent members to have represented Casey include Peter Howson, who served as a minister in the McMahon Government; Bob Halverson, who was Speaker of the House of Representatives 1996–98; Michael Wooldridge, who served as Minister for Health in the first five years of the Howard government (1996–2001); and Tony Smith, Speaker from 2015 until 2021.

Members

Election results

References

External links
 Division of Casey – Australian Electoral Commission

Electoral divisions of Australia
Constituencies established in 1969
1969 establishments in Australia
Yarra Ranges